Vasind is a railway station on the Central line of the Mumbai Suburban Railway network.

References

Railway stations in Thane district
Mumbai Suburban Railway stations
Mumbai CR railway division
Kalyan-Igatpuri rail line